Thomas Flood was a Scottish professional footballer who played as an outside forward. Flood signed for Dundee Hibernian from rivals Dundee and featured briefly in Hibs' inaugural season in the Northern League before being released at the end of the season. Flood returned to Tannadice Park in October 1914 and although his remaining appearances for the club were in the latter part of that year, he remained a signed player throughout the First World War, leaving in May 1919. Making only eight first team league appearances during his two spells with Hibs, it is unknown where Flood went after leaving for the second time.

References

Dundee F.C. players
Dundee United F.C. players
Scottish footballers
Year of birth missing
Year of death missing
Place of death missing
Association football wingers